"Mockingbird" is a song by American rapper Eminem from his fifth studio album Encore (2004). It was released as the fifth single from the album in April 2005. It peaked at number eleven on the Billboard Hot 100, and number four in the United Kingdom. It received a Grammy nomination for Best Rap Solo Performance, but lost to "Gold Digger" by Kanye West. "Mockingbird" was later included on Eminem's greatest hits compilation album Curtain Call: The Hits (2005).

Critical response
Entertainment Weeklys David Browne was angered: "Again he addresses a song to his daughter (Mockingbird) and explains how he's working hard at being a good father." J-23 of HipHopDX praised the song: "Things get a bit better at the end, 'Mockingbird' is another song for Haile that is most notable for flawless delivery." Steve Jones of USA Today was positive: "The affectionate Mockingbird talks directly to his 9-year-old daughter, Hailie Jade, and 8-year-old niece, Alaina, trying to explain Kim's troubles with the law and his constant travel." James Corne of RapReviews was also satisfied, saying, "Predictably, Eminem lays down one for Hailie with "Mockingbird," but what is not foreseeable is that it actually works"; and he noted that it imitates Em himself. The New York Times was mixed: "the I-love-my-daughter ode 'Mockingbird'" isn't the most exciting thing according to Kelefa Sanneh. Stylus Magazine was negative: "Encore dutifully deploys the obligatory Hailie ode ("Mockingbird")."

The A.V. Club was a bit positive: "On 'Mockingbird,' Eminem lets his hatred of his ex-wife lie dormant just long enough to provide his daughter with a haunting account of how parents sometimes just can't make it work, no matter how much both parties want to." Los Angeles Times also agreed: "In the tender 'Mockingbird,' the Detroit-based rapper outlines his devotion to his daughter, Hailie. Against a restrained, almost hypnotic musical backdrop, Eminem tries to help the child make sense of a world in which her father is always on the run because of his career, and her mother, Kim, makes headlines with legal troubles, including a drug arrest last year. Normally, much of Eminem's lure as a rapper is in the speed and authority of his rapid-fire delivery, but he raps here with the gentleness of a man with his arms around his daughter: 'I know it's confusing to you/ Daddy's always on the move/ Mama's always on the news.'" The Austin Chronicle is a bit negative, saying that in the song "he still hates his ... ex-wife as much as he loves his daughter. Yawn." The Boston Phoenix called it "the address-to-his-daughter" song that is "more consistently remarkable than 'Mosh'".

Music video
The video premiered on MTV TRL on February 21, 2005 and features Eminem sitting in a living room all alone watching home movies about his daughters. Directorial video for John "QUIG" Quigley. This is the second video to feature Eminem with his glasses, the first being "Stan".

Sampling
Baby Keem's song "Apologize" from his 2019 mixtape Die for My Bitch samples his unique, but well-known flow, uses a similar melodic tone as Eminem's "Mockingbird", in his pre-chorus and chorus.

Lil Nas X's song "Dont Want It" (from his 2021 album Montero) samples "Mockingbird" for its chorus; being similar in word pattern and lyrics.

British Rapper E1 (3x3) released a remix to the song in 2022.

Awards and nominations

Track listing
UK CD1, digital download, German 3" CD single

UK CD2

Digital EP

German CD single

Notes
 signifies an additional producer.

Chart positions

Weekly charts

Year-end charts

Certifications

References

2000s ballads
2005 singles
2004 songs
Eminem songs
Songs written by Eminem
Song recordings produced by Eminem
Contemporary R&B ballads
Songs based on children's songs
Songs about parenthood
Songs written by Luis Resto (musician)